Unisys Corporation is an American multinational information technology (IT) services and consulting company founded in 1986 and headquartered in Blue Bell, Pennsylvania. The company has offices globally and provides digital workplace, cloud applications & infrastructure, enterprise computing and business process services to the world’s leading organizations.

History

Founding 

Unisys was formed in 1986 through the merger of mainframe corporations Sperry and Burroughs, with Burroughs buying Sperry for $4.8 billion. The name was chosen from over 31,000 submissions in an internal competition when Christian Machen submitted the word "Unisys" which was composed of parts of the words united, information and systems.

The merger was the largest in the computer industry at the time and made Unisys the second largest computer company with annual revenue of $10.5 billion. Michael Blumenthal became CEO and Chairman. Soon after the merger, the market for proprietary mainframe-class systems—the mainstream product of Unisys and its competitors such as IBM—began a long-term decline that continues, at a lesser rate, today. In response, Unisys made the strategic decision to shift into high-end servers (e.g., 32-bit processor Windows Servers), as well as information technology (IT) services such as systems integration, outsourcing, and related technical services, while holding onto the profitable revenue stream from maintaining its installed base of proprietary mainframe hardware and applications.

In 1988, the company acquired Convergent Technologies, makers of CTOS.

In 1990, Blumenthal resigned. James Unruh (formerly of Memorex and Honeywell) became the new CEO and Chairman after Blumenthal's departure and continued in that role until 1997, when Larry Weinbach of Arthur Andersen became the new CEO.

Product development and CEO changes 
Joseph McGrath served as CEO and President from January 2005, until September, 2008. On October 7, 2008, J. Edward Coleman replaced J. McGrath as CEO and was named Chairman of the board as well. On November 10, 2008, the company was removed from the S&P 500 index as the market capitalization of the company had fallen below the S&P 500 minimum of $4 billion.

In 2010, Unisys sold its Medicare processing Health Information Management service to Molina Healthcare for $135 million.

On October 6, 2014, after six years as CEO and chairman, Unisys announced that Coleman was stepping down effective December 1, 2014.

On January 1, 2015, Unisys officially named Peter Altabef as its new president and CEO, replacing Edward Coleman. Paul Weaver, who was formerly Lead Independent Director, was named Chairman.

2020–present time 
In February 2020, SAIC announced plans to acquire Unisys Federal, the company’s federal defense contracting operation, for $1.2 billion. The company’s federal customer list included over a dozen military and civilian agencies.  As part of the acquisition, Unisys has a licensing agreement with SAIC to continue providing its software to the federal clients.

In June 2020, Australia’s Home Affairs’ biometric identification system, built in part through partnership with Unisys, was launched.

In June 2021, the company announced the acquisition of Unify Square. Unify Square provides software and services which help companies manage collaboration and communication platforms like Zoom and Microsoft Teams. In November, Mobinergy, a mobile device management software company, was acquired; and in December, Unisys acquired CompuGain, an Amazon Web Services Advanced Consulting Partner.

In July 2021, Unisys partnered with Vodafone to help the company boost its IT services. The two launched “Vodafone Digital Factory,” and Unisys helped Vodafone clients with technologies like AI, virtual and augmented reality, and blockchain.

In May 2022, the company joined the Plug and Play Enterprise Tech program. This allowed Unisys to source and partner with technology startups to access and use early-stage emerging technology.

Recognition and awards 
 In 2018, 2019, and 2020, Unisys was named an overall market segment leader in the NelsonHall Evaluation & Assessment Tool Vendor Evaluation for Advanced Digital Workplace Services.
 NelsonHall: 2021 NEAT Assessment, Leader, Cognitive and Self-Healing IT Infrastructure Services
 In August 2020, Unisys Corporation reported that for the third straight year, NelsonHall has listed the organization as the regional market sector leader in the Evaluation & Assessment Tool (NEAT) Vendor Analysis report for Advanced Digital Workplace Services.
 Avasant: 2021 RadarView – Digital Workplace Services
 NelsonHall: 2022 NEAT Assessment, Leader, End-to-end Cloud Infrastructure Services
 Everest Group: 2022 PEAK Matrix - Cloud Services, Major Contender - North America and Europe

 In 2022, the company was named a Forbes’ America’s Best Employers For Women and a Leader in Advanced Digital Workplace Services Assessment.

Products and services
Unisys offers outsourcing managed services, systems integration and consulting services, application management and device management software, high end server technology, maintenance and support services, and cybersecurity services.

In line with larger trends in the information technology industry, an increasing amount of Unisys revenue comes from services rather than equipment sales; in 2014, the ratio was 86% for services, up from 65% in 1997. The company maintains a portfolio of over 1,500 U.S. and non-U.S. patents.

In 2014, Unisys phased out its CMOS processors, completing the migration of its ClearPath mainframes to Intel x86 chips, allowing clients to run the company's OS 2200 and MCP operating systems alongside more recent Windows and Linux workloads on Intel-based systems that support cloud and virtualization. The company announced its new ClearPath Dorado 8380 and 8390 systems in May, 2015. These new systems allowed the company to transition its ClearPath server families from proprietary CMOS processor technology to a software-based fabric architecture running on Intel processors.

Unisys operates data centers around the world.

 Digital Workplace Services (DWS)
 In March 2022, Vision-Box awarded Unisys two digital workplace solutions contracts to help build automated “SmartGates,” electronic security gates, at New Zealand’s Auckland International Airport and Australia’s 10 international airports.

 Cloud, Applications, and Infrastructure (CA & I)
 California State University used Unisys’ CloudForte and Managed Security Services to integrate its hybrid-cloud environment.
 After acquiring Compugain, Unisys furthered its cloud capabilities, including hybrid cloud and cloud optimization, agile cloud migration, cloud-native capabilities, and data governance.
 Cybersecurity
 In November 2020, Unisys updated its Stealth platform to include visualization and dashboard tools to make it easier for an organization to track security in real-time. The new version made it possible for cybersecurity teams to see relationships between all network endpoints, including multiple clouds and edge computing platforms.

 Enterprise Computing (ECS)
 Unisys was the first to develop a server architecture that supported four operating environments to run simultaneously on the same computer system in a single virtualized partition.
 In 2013, Unisys won a $650 million Enterprise Computing Center Support contract to support the computer systems used by the Internal Revenue Service.
Business Processes (BPS)
Unisys launched their business process consulting service in 2004. This service called Business Blueprints helped developers create high level models of their own software.
The company partners with Rubicon Technologies to deliver business process solutions.

Partnerships 
Unisys’ company partnerships include the following:

 VMware
 Oracle
 British Telecom
 Dell Technologies
 Amazon Web Services (AWS) MSP Partner and an AWS Government Competency
 Microsoft Azure Expert MSP partner and a Microsoft Gold Partner
 Global managed services partner to ServiceNow
 Google Cloud Partner Advantage Program as a Google Cloud and Google Workspace Resell Partner

Clients

Clients include Bank ABC, Hershey, the Bank of China, Somos, Henkel, Flowserve, The Philippine Statistics Authority (PSA), MASkargo (the cargo division of Malaysia Airlines), Nutreco,  California State University (CSU), Air India, RAMS Home Loans, and the Georgia Technology Authority. 

Unisys systems are used for many industrial and government purposes, including banking, check processing, income tax processing, airline passenger reservations, biometric identification, newspaper content management, and shipping port management, as well as providing weather data services.

Projects
Additional projects include the following:

Consumerization of IT
A study sponsored by Unisys and conducted by IDC revealed the gap between the activities and expectations of the new generation of "iWorkers" and the ability of organizations to support their needs. The results showed that organizations continue to work with standardized command and control IT models of the past and are not able to profit from the widespread use of newer networked technologies.

Cloud 20/20
Cloud 20/20 is an annual technical paper contest for tertiary students from India in October 2009. The contest allows students to explore the possibilities and complexities of cloud computing in areas such as automation, virtualization, application development, security, consumerization of IT and airports. The contest has drawn participation from universities across India, with over 570 institutes taking part in 2009 and more than a thousand in 2010. The contest culminates in an event where five finalists present their papers before a panel of judges that comprise academicians and technologists. Prizes include the latest technology gadgets, internship projects and career opportunities with Unisys.

Controversies 
In 1987, Unisys was sued with Rockwell Shuttle Operations Company for $5.2 million by two former employees of the Unisys Corporation, one a subcontractor responsible for the computer programs for the space shuttle. The suit filed by Sylvia Robins, a former Unisys engineer, and Ria Solomon, who worked for Robins, charges that the two were forced from their jobs and harassed after complaining about safety violations and inflated costs.

Unisys overcharged the U.S. government and in 1998 was found guilty of failure to supply adequate equipment. In 1998, Unisys Corporation agreed to pay the government $2.25 million to settle allegations that it supplied refurbished, rather than new, computer materials to several federal agencies in violation of the terms of its contract. Unisys admitted to supplying re-worked or refurbished computer components to various civilian and military agencies in the early 1990s, when the contract required the company to provide new equipment. The market price for the refurbished material was less than the price for new material which the government paid.

In 1998, Unisys was found guilty of price inflation and government contract fraud, with the company settling to avoid further prosecution. Lockheed Martin and Unisys paid the government $3.15 million to settle allegations that Unisys inflated the prices of spare parts sold to the U.S. Department of Commerce for its NEXRAD Doppler Radar System, in violation of the False Claims Act, 31 U.S.C. § 3729, et seq. "[T]he settlement resolves allegations that Unisys knew that prices it paid Concurrent Computer Corporation for the spare parts were inflated when it passed on those prices to the government. Unisys had obtained price discounts from Concurrent on other items Unisys was purchasing from Concurrent at Unisys' own expense in exchange for agreeing to pay Concurrent the inflated prices".

In October 2005, the Washington Post reported that the company had allegedly overbilled on the $1-to-3-billion Transportation Security Administration contract for almost 171,000 hours of labor and overtime at up to the maximum rate of $131.13 per hour, including 24,983 hours not allowed by the contract. Unisys denied wrongdoing.

In 2006, the Washington Post reported that the FBI was investigating Unisys for alleged cybersecurity lapses under the company's contract with the United States Department of Homeland Security. A number of security lapses supposedly occurred during the contract, including incidents in which data was transmitted to Chinese servers. Unisys denies all charges and said it has documentation disproving the allegations.

In 2007, Unisys was found guilty of misrepresentation of retiree benefits. A federal judge in Pennsylvania ordered Unisys Corp. to reinstate within 60 days free lifetime retiree medical benefits to 12 former employees who were employed by a Unisys predecessor, the Burroughs Corporation. The judge ruled that Unisys "misrepresented the cost and duration of retiree medical benefits" at a time "trial plaintiffs were making retirement decisions" and while it was advising them about the benefits the company would provide during retirement.

Also in 2007, Unisys was found guilty of willful trademark infringement in Visible Systems v. Unisys (Trademark Infringement). Computer company Visible Systems prevailed over Unisys Corp. in a trademark infringement lawsuit filed in Massachusetts federal court. In November 2007, the court entered an injunction and final judgment ordering Unisys to discontinue its use of the "Visible" trademark, upholding the jury's award to Visible Systems of $250,000 in damages, and awarding an additional $17,555 in interest. Visible Systems claimed Unisys wrongfully used the name "Visible" in marketing its software and services. The jury found the infringement by Unisys was willful. Visible Systems appealed the final judgment, believing the court wrongly excluded the issues of bad faith and disgorgement of an estimated $17 billion in unjust profits from the consideration of the jury.

In 2010, Unisys Hungary terminated the local Workers' Union representative Gabor Pinter's employment contract with immediate effect for raising concerns on the company's practice about the overtime payments and the non-respect of the health regulations in its local Shared Services Center. According to the verdict of the Labour Court of Budapest, Unisys' act was illegal and the Company must reimburse all damages of the Workers' Union representative.

See also

References

External links

 

 
1986 establishments in Pennsylvania
Companies based in Montgomery County, Pennsylvania
Companies listed on the New York Stock Exchange
Computer companies of the United States
American companies established in 1986
Consulting firms established in 1986
Computer companies established in 1986
Information technology companies of the United States
Information technology consulting firms of the United States